German submarine U-160 was a Type IXC U-boat of Nazi Germany's Kriegsmarine built for service during World War II. The keel for this boat was laid down on 21 November 1940 at the DeSchiMAG AG Weser yard in Bremen, Germany as yard number 1010. She was launched on 12 July 1941 and commissioned on 16 October under the command of Kapitänleutnant Georg Lassen (Knight's Cross).

The U-boat's service began in training with the 4th U-boat Flotilla. She lost seven men and one was injured in a fire on 14 December 1941 at Danzig (now Gdańsk, Poland). She then moved to the 10th flotilla on 1 March 1942 for operations.

She sank 26 ships, totalling  and damaged five more, for 34,419 GRT. She was sunk by American carrier-borne aircraft on 14 July 1943.

Design
German Type IXC submarines were slightly larger than the original Type IXBs. U-160 had a displacement of  when at the surface and  while submerged. She had two shafts and two  propellers.

U-160 was fitted with six  torpedo tubes (four fitted at the bow and two at the stern), 22 torpedoes, one  SK C/32 naval gun, 180 rounds, and a  SK C/30 as well as a  C/30 anti-aircraft gun. The boat had a complement of forty-eight.

Service history

Before starting on her first patrol, U-160 made a brief journey from Wilhelmshaven to Helgoland on 24 February 1942.

First and second patrols
She departed the German island on 1 March 1942, crossed the North Sea entered the Atlantic Ocean via the Faroe / Shetland gap and headed for the US east coast. The confusion of the sinking was not helped by there being nationals from at least ten countries among the crew. The boat went on to successfully attack City of New York, Rio Blanco and Ulysses. One ship that did not sink was Bidwell; indeed, she survived the war, not being broken up until 1965.

U-160s second foray saw the boat leave Lorient on 20 June 1942. She crossed the Atlantic again but made for the northern coast of South America. The pickings were just as rich here as they had been further north. Sinking Beaconlight, Carmona and the Treminnard, who were all sailing without an escort, was accomplished within  of Trinidad. She also damaged Thorshavet, an 11,015 GRT tanker, with torpedo and gun on 4 August 1942. The drifting wreck was subsequently sunk by the Italian submarine Enrico Tazzoli on 6 August. U-160 returned to Lorient on the 24th.

Third patrol
It was during her third patrol that the boat almost came to grief. She sank HMS Castle Harbour, which was travelling as part of Convoy TRIN-19 from Trinidad at 2120 hours on 16 October 1942. The ship sank within twenty seconds with the loss of nine of her twenty-two crew. U-160 herself was attacked by the escorts of the convoy, but the damage was slight. The submarine returned to her former hunting grounds off South America and sank Gypsum Express and Leda to name but two.

Fourth patrol
Her fourth sortie was her longest, at 125 days, but also her most successful. Moving into the south Atlantic, she sank  on 8 February. She then attacked and sank Nirpura, Empire Mahseer and Marietta E. east of South Africa. Also lost with Marietta E. were eight landing craft. Other ships were also sunk. When the submariners questioned the survivors of Aelbryn, they misunderstood the ship's name, reporting it as Arian, an American vessel.

Fifth patrol and loss
By now she was based in Bordeaux, from which she departed on 29 June 1943. She was sunk by TBM Avenger and F4F Wildcat aircraft from the carrier USS Santee south of the Azores on 14 July 1943 with the loss of all 57 on board.

Summary of raiding history

References

Bibliography

External links

German Type IX submarines
U-boats commissioned in 1941
U-boats sunk in 1943
World War II submarines of Germany
World War II shipwrecks in the Atlantic Ocean
1941 ships
Ships built in Bremen (state)
U-boats sunk by US aircraft
Ships lost with all hands
Maritime incidents in July 1943